Satish Chandra Sharma (born 30 November 1961) is an Indian judge. Presently, he is Chief Justice of Delhi High Court. He is former Chief Justice of Telangana High Court. He has served as Acting Chief Justice of Karnataka High Court and Judge of Karnataka High Court and Madhya Pradesh High Court.

Career
Justice Sharma enrolled as an advocate on 1 September 1984 and became one of the leading lawyers of Madhya Pradesh. In 2003, he was designated as a Senior Advocate by the High Court of Madhya Pradesh at the young age of 42 being one of the youngest senior advocates of  Madhya Pradesh  High Court. He practiced in constitutional, service, civil and criminal matters in the High Court of Madhya Pradesh. He was elevated as Additional Judge of Madhya Pradesh High Court on 18 January 2008 and permanent on 15 January 2010. He was transferred as Judge of Karnataka High Court on 31 December 2020 and took oath on 4th January 2021. Justice Sharma was later appointed Acting Chief Justice of Karnataka High Court on 31 August 2021 consequent upon the appointment of Justice Abhay Shreeniwas Oka as a Judge of Supreme Court of India. He was elevated as Chief Justice of Telangana High Court on 11 October 2021. He was transferred as Chief Justice of Delhi High Court on 28 June 2022.

Education
He secured degree of Bachelor of Science in the year 1981 with distinction in three subjects. Awarded National Merit Scholarship for Post Graduate Studies. Enrolled as a student of law in Dr. Hari Singh Gour  University, Sagar  in 1981. Graduated on top of the class and obtained L.L.B. degree in 1984 with three university Gold Medals.

Family
His father, Dr. B N Sharma apart from being an agriculturalist, was also an eminent academician who served as a  professor of Jabalpur University and as the Vice Chancellor of  Barkatullah University. Mother Shrimati Shanti Sharma was a principal in Maharani Lakshmibai Higher Secondary  school and also worked as district education officer at Jabalpur before retirement.

Further information
Justice Sharma is on the advisory board of Law Journal published by National Law Institute University, Bhopal.

References

1961 births
Living people
Judges of the Madhya Pradesh High Court
21st-century Indian judges
20th-century Indian lawyers